Chukauni is a Nepalese side dish originated around the Palpa district of western Nepal. It is made from boiled potatoes, yogurt, onion, coriander and spices. It is a popular type of salad and eaten mainly as a side dish with roti, sel roti, steamed rice or batuk. 

It can be eaten both warm or cold. It is a simple dish to make with few ingredients.

See also 

 Sel roti
 Raita
 Nepali pickles

References

Nepalese cuisine
Vegetable dishes
Palpali Chukauni Recipe

External links 

 Anup's kitchen recipe 
 Recipe by SBS Australia

Potato dishes
Yogurt-based dishes